The dancesport competitions at the 2009 World Games in Kaohsiung was held between 24 and 25 July. 147 dancers from 39 nations, participated in the tournament. The dancesport competition took place at Kaohsiung Arena.

Participating nations

Medal table

Events

References

External links
 World DanceSport Federation
 Dancesport on IWGA website
 Results

 
2009 World Games
2009